This list details major events in Azerbaijani football in 2010-11. In that year Neftçi PFK won the Azerbaijan Premier League championship, while Georgi Adamia of Qarabağ FK led the league with 18 goals that season.

Azerbaijan Premier League

Championship group

Relegation group

Azerbaijan First Division

Azerbaijan Cup

National team

References